WCVJ (90.9 FM) is an American radio station located in Jefferson, Ohio. It is owned by Educational Media Foundation and airs EMF's Air1 nationally syndicated Christian Worship format.

History
WCVJ went on the air in 1978.  The station was locally owned and operated by Agape School, Inc., headed by Myron J. Hubler.  WCVJ transmitted 5,500 watts ERP with an antenna height of 372 feet.

For many years, WCVJ signed on the air at 6AM and signed off at 10PM.  The station was off the air on Sundays.  The hymn "Victory in Jesus" played each morning at sign-on.  The station's operating parameters, studio address and mailing address was announced during the song.  A prayer conducted by the morning DJ immediately followed.  Right before sign-off, the evening DJ would say a prayer at the conclusion of the broadcast day, followed by the national anthem.

The broadcast day eventually expanded to 24 hours a day by the mid 1990s, but broadcasts on Sunday were completely automated.  WCVJ started a fund raising effort to build a new and taller broadcast tower.  The tower raised the antenna to 571 feet, approximately a 200-foot increase.  The tower was finally built by 2001.

WCVJ played a Contemporary Christian format mainly consisting of Praise and Worship music, although the DJ would occasionally vary the format.  National and local Christian teaching programs accounted for 50% of the daily broadcast schedule.  WCVJ played music tailored to teens and young adults on Saturday evenings, similar to the Air1 format that currently airs.

In September 2005, Agape School, Inc. sold WCVJ to Educational Media Foundation for $650,000.

WCVJ was patterned after two other Christian radio stations in Ohio, WCVO in the Columbus area and the now-defunct WCVZ in Zanesville (now WZNP "The Promise" in Newark). Like WCVZ, the transmission tower of WCVJ is marked by lights in the shape of a cross atop the tower. Despite the similarities, however, WCVJ was (and continues to be) operated by a distinct entity from that operating WCVO and WCVZ. Agape School maintained only friendly communication with Christian Voice, not a formal affiliation.

Agape School
Agape School was founded by Myron and Sarah Hubler as a way for Christians to learn more about their religion. The school is not accredited, but instead offers courses solely for personal enrichment. The school eventually received a license from the FCC to operate a radio station, WCVJ.

References

External links

CVJ
Mass media in Ashtabula County, Ohio
Air1 radio stations
Educational Media Foundation radio stations